The 1945 PGA Championship was the 27th PGA Championship, held July 9–15 at Moraine Country Club in Kettering, Ohio, a suburb south of Dayton. Then a match play championship, Byron Nelson won 4 & 3 in the final over Sam Byrd, a former major league baseball player.

It was Nelson's fifth and final major title and his second win at the PGA Championship; he also won in 1940 and was a runner-up three times (1939, 1941, 1944). The winner's share of the purse was $5,000 in war bonds. The victory was the ninth of Nelson's record eleven consecutive wins in 1945.

Defending champion Bob Hamilton was defeated in the first round by Jack Grout, 4 & 3.

Due to World War II, the PGA Championship was the sole major played in 1945 (and 1944). The three others returned in 1946.

Format
The match play format at the PGA Championship in 1945 called for 12 rounds (216 holes) in seven days:
 Monday and Tuesday – 36-hole stroke play qualifier, 18 holes per day, field of 78 players;
defending champion Bob Hamilton and top 31 professionals advanced to match play
 Wednesday – first round – 36 holes
 Thursday – second round – 36 holes
 Friday – quarterfinals – 36 holes
 Saturday – semifinals – 36 holes
 Sunday – final – 36 holes

Past champions in the field

Final results
Sunday, July 15, 1945

Final eight bracket

Final match scorecards
Morning

Afternoon

Source:

References

External links
PGA Media Guide 2012
PGA.com – 1945 PGA Championship

PGA Championship
Golf in Ohio
Kettering, Ohio
PGA Championship
PGA Championship
PGA Championship
PGA Championship